Amorbia trisecta is a species of moth of the family Tortricidae. It is found in Peru.

The wingspan is about 24 mm. The forewings are pale brownish ferruginous with some brown strigulae (fine streaks) and brown markings. The hindwings are brownish.

Etymology
The species name refers to the pale lines which divide the wing into three parts and is derived from Greek treis or tri (meaning three) and Latin secta (meaning cut).

References

Moths described in 2010
Sparganothini
Moths of South America
Taxa named by Józef Razowski